Designit (imperative mood, meaning 'design it' and pronounced 'dɪˈzʌɪn ɪt') is an international strategic design firm founded in Aarhus, Denmark, in 1991 by Anders Geert Jensen and Mikal Hallstrup. In 1994, David Fellah joined the company as equal partner. Designit headquarters is located in Copenhagen, Denmark, with 17 offices in Aarhus, Barcelona, Bengaluru, Berlin, Stockholm, Sydney, Lima, London, Madrid, Medellín, Munich, Oslo, San Francisco, Tel Aviv, Tokyo and New York City.

Designit offers integrated strategic design and innovation services, including product design, service design, and experience design, with an emphasis on mobile and digital media. The company recently expanded its services to include consulting in business design.

Designit's employees work in cross-disciplinary teams, involving clients and end-users in the design process. Designit works in various sectors, including healthcare, finance, IT, telecommunications, automotive and consumer goods.

Designit's work has received more than 100 design awards, including International Forum Design awards (iF), Red Dot and Red Dot Gold, and GOOD design awards.

In July 2015, Designit was sold to an Indian major IT firm Wipro for a reported  million (USD94 million).

References

External links
 Official website

Consulting firms established in 1991
Design companies of Denmark
Design companies based in Copenhagen
Companies based in Copenhagen Municipality
Defense companies of Denmark
Danish companies established in 1991